The 1923 New York state election was held on November 6, 1923, to elect a judge of the New York Court of Appeals, as well as all members of the New York State Assembly.

History
In 1923, there was only one state officer to be elected statewide: a judge of the Court of Appeals, to succeed John W. Hogan, who would reach the constitutional age limit at the end of the year.

The Democratic State Committee met on September 28. Supreme Court Justice Irving Lehman was nominated for the Court of Appeals unanimously.

The Republican State Committee met on September 29. The Democratic nominee, Supreme Court Justice Irving Lehman, was endorsed for the Court of Appeals.

Result
The jointly nominated candidate was elected.

Notes

See also
New York state elections

1923
1923 New York (state) elections
Results: New York Red Book 1924